Thu and variations may refer to:

 Thursday
 Thu (surname), the Gan romanization of the Chinese surname Su
 Thu (pronoun) or Þu, an Old English pronoun
 Thû, an early name for Sauron in J.R.R. Tolkien's works
 Thu, Palpa, a village development committee in Nepal
 Thu., abbreviation for the orchid genus Thunia
 Thu, a dog belonging to the Claidi and Argul in The Claidi Journals by Tanith Lee
 Tsinghua University in China
 Tunghai University, a university in Taichung, Taiwan
 Thule Air Base (IATA airport code)
 Thư, the Vietnamese romanization of the Chinese surname Shu (surname), 舒